Karin Kessow (born 8 January 1954, married name Drbal) is a retired German speed skater who won the World All-Round Speed Skating Championships in 1975. Next year she competed at the 1976 Winter Olympics in the 1500 m and 3000 m and finished in fifth and fourth  place, respectively.

After marrying Karl-Heinz Drbal she changed her last name to Drbal. She works as a speed skating coach in Berlin.

Personal bests: 
500 m – 44.2 (1976)
1000 m – 1:27.2 (1976)
1500 m – 2:13.1 (1976)
 3000 m – 4:39.1 (1976)
 5000 m – 8:20.4 (1976)

References

External links

 

1954 births
Living people
Sportspeople from Rostock
People from Bezirk Rostock
German female speed skaters
Speed skating coaches
Speed skaters at the 1976 Winter Olympics
Olympic speed skaters of East Germany
World Allround Speed Skating Championships medalists
20th-century German women